Ghada Jamshir is a Bahraini women's rights activist and an ardent campaigner for the reform of Sharia courts in Bahrain and the Arab States of the Persian Gulf. Jamshir heads the Women's Petition Committee lobbying for a law that would shift jurisdiction over family and women's affairs from Islamic Sharia court to civil courts.

Jamshir has called the Al Khalifa government's reforms "artificial and marginal". In a statement in December 2006 she said,

Jamshir has been outspoken in criticizing the Bahraini government for its role in the Bandargate scandal. In 2007 she alleged that the Interior Ministry was attempting to spy on her.

Backlash by the government
In 2005, the Bahraini government brought three criminal charges against Jamshir for allegedly publicly defaming the Islamic family court judiciary, and faced a jail sentence of up to 15 years. These charges were eventually dropped on 19 June 2005.

Since 2006, Ghada Jamsheer has been under permanent surveillance, there is a 24-hour presence of plainclothes public security officials of the Ministry of the Interior outside her home.

After her criticism of government policies, Bahrain authorities ordered the local media and press to prevent the publication of any news relating to Jamshir. The order came from the Royal Court, through its minister Shaikh Khalid bin Ahmed Al Khalifa. Jamshir also claims that the Minister of the Royal Court gave her a direct threat demanding that she end her public work, after which the regime attempted to install a spy camera in her house, bugged her telephone, and sent individuals to bribe and blackmail her.

In 2006, Time magazine identified Jamshir as one of four heroes of freedom in the Arab world, and Forbes magazine selected her as one of the ten most powerful and effective women in the Arab world.

See also 
Human rights in Bahrain
Women's political rights in Bahrain

References

External links
Ghada Jamsheer's blog
Women's Petition Committee: Appointment of Sharia Judges as political gifts for religious groups 
 Bahrain: Courts Try to Silence Women’s Rights Activist , Human Rights Watch, 2 June 2005
Ghada Jamshir interview
Article on Ghada Jamshir
transcript of interview with Ghada Jamshir
Bahraini women demand unified civil status law

Muslim reformers
Bahraini activists
Bahraini women activists
Bahraini dissidents
Bahraini Muslims
Year of birth missing (living people)
Living people
Bahraini people of Iranian descent